Iosef "Soso" Palelashvili (born 6 September 1986, Gori) is an Israeli judoka. He competes in the Lightweight (under 73 kg) weight category.

Palelashvili competed in Judo at the 2012 Summer Olympics.  He beat Sezer Huysuz in his first match, but lost the next to Riki Nakaya.

Palelashvili was born in Gori, Georgia and in 2008 made aliyah with his Jewish wife.

References

External links

 
 
 

1986 births
Living people
People from Gori, Georgia
Israeli male judoka
Olympic judoka of Israel
Judoka at the 2012 Summer Olympics
Georgian emigrants to Israel
Georgian people of Israeli descent
Israeli people of Georgian-Jewish descent